Elemental is the debut album by Canadian singer-songwriter and instrumentalist Loreena McKennitt and the vehicle with which she launched the Quinlan Road label.  The album was recorded in one week in July 1985 and released later in the year. The studio was a barn in southern Ontario, situated in a field of sunflowers. It sold 67,000 pieces worldwide.

Track listing
 "Blacksmith" (traditional, McKennitt) – 3:20
 "She Moved Through the Fair" (traditional, Padraic Colum, McKennitt) – 4:05
 "Stolen Child" (McKennitt, W. B. Yeats) – 5:05
 "The Lark in the Clear Air" (traditional, McKennitt) – 2:06
 "Carrighfergus" ( Cedric Smith ( main vocals ) , McKennitt ) – 3:24
 "Kellswater" (traditional, McKennitt) – 5:19
 "Banks of Claudy" (traditional, McKennitt) – 5:37
 "Come by the Hills" (traditional, McKennitt) – 3:05
 "Lullaby" (William Blake, McKennitt) – 4:26

Song information

 "Stolen Child" is based on the William Butler Yeats poem "The Stolen Child".
 The main vocals of "Carrighfergus" are sung by Cedric Smith.
 "Lullaby" uses the words of a poem by William Blake Prologue intended for a dramatic piece of King Edward the Fourth. The song was written for the 1983 Stratford Festival of Canada production of Blake by Elliott Hayes and performed by Douglas Campbell.

Notes

1985 debut albums
Loreena McKennitt albums